William Hodder (born: 31 August 1947) is a sailor from Australia, who represented his country at the 1992 Summer Olympics in Barcelona, Spain as helmsman in the Soling. With crew members Tim Dorning and Michael Mottl they took the 11th place.

References

1947 births
Living people
Sailors at the 1992 Summer Olympics – Soling
Olympic sailors of Australia
Australian male sailors (sport)
20th-century Australian people